"One Step Closer" is the debut single by the American rock band Linkin Park. Released as the first single and second track of their debut album, Hybrid Theory, the song was featured in the 2008 music video games Rock Band 2 and Guitar Hero On Tour: Decades, and the end credits of the 2000 film Dracula 2000.

A remixed version of the song entitled "1Stp Klosr", featuring Korn frontman Jonathan Davis, was featured on Linkin Park's remix album, Reanimation. In 2021, Linkin Park released a new remix of the song by electronic duo 100 gecs.

This song was mashed up with another song by the band from Hybrid Theory, "Points of Authority", and a collaboration of the song "99 Problems" from The Black Album by Jay-Z on the EP Collision Course.

Live performances
In 2001, Linkin Park performed "One Step Closer" on The Conan O'Brien Show.

Until 2007, Linkin Park closed every concert with "One Step Closer", excluding Live 8, and their live performances at Summer Sonic. In 2007, Linkin Park played "One Step Closer" toward the beginning of their live performances and sometimes at the end. The song is always played in Drop C#. In 2008, they ended some of their shows with either "One Step Closer" or "Bleed It Out". In 2009, every show they played was ended with "One Step Closer", excluding the Transformers: Revenge of the Fallen premiere.

During the 2001 MTV VMA performance of the song, the band had the X-Ecutioners do an extended break before the bridge. This part was somewhat similar to the atmosphere on the remix, with synth parts and faint vocal parts being scratched.

From 2003 to 2006, performances of the song include a verse originally sung by Jonathan Davis in the Reanimation remix of the song before the "Shut up when I'm talking to you!" bridge, which can be heard on LP Underground 4.0. At the end of the verse, Davis repeats the line "Blood is pouring" while the song builds up to the bridge. During the Projekt Revolution 2004 Tour, as Korn was part of the tour's line up, Davis would come out to sing his part on the song before Chester Bennington starts screaming his part.

On several of these occasions, Mike Shinoda would sing "Blood is pouring" under Bennington's screaming during this part, as was done by Jonathan Davis on the remix. This was half-done on the performance at 2004's Rock am Ring (in that Shinoda only sung the part during the second half of the bridge) and fully done on performances during 2003 and 2004's Projekt Revolution tours (along with Davis on the 2004 tour), which was completely recorded and included as a B-side on the "Faint" single and is available as a bonus track for Reanimation when purchased on iTunes. On the single cover, it is called "One Step Closer (Reanimated Live)". It can also be heard on the Live from Nottingham Rock City 2003 Live from Nottingham record. During the 2006 live performances in Japan, the Reanimation bridge was played with the main riff of the song.

During the band's 2007 tour, "One Step Closer" became the opening song of Linkin Park's performances, and the Reanimation verse was removed. It also featured a new, extended intro featuring Shinoda on rhythm guitar. In 2008, it had a new extended outro, and sometimes it was performed as the last song.

For the 2009 International Tour, the song was used as the final song of setlists, with an extended outro featuring a guitar solo by Shinoda while Brad Delson played an extended rhythm section during the solo. On the A Thousand Suns World Tour onward, the songs served as the last song in certain setlists. In others, the song closed off the main set instead.

The tours for The Hunting Party and One More Light (in 2014-2015 and 2017 respectively), however, consistently placed the song mid-set instead of closing either the main set or the show. On the One More Light World Tour, the song was performed with a brand new extended intro based on the Gunshot Intros, particularly the 2007 Intro.

On October 27, 2017, during the Linkin Park and Friends: Celebrate Life in Honor of Chester Bennington, Jonathan Davis performed the song again with the remaining Linkin Park members alongside Ryan Shuck and Amir Derakh of Julien-K and Dead by Sunrise. The performance retained the 2017 Intro, but the extended outro was not played for the first time since 2008.

Music video
Joe Hahn of Linkin Park and director Gregory Dark came up with the concept for the video. The original version of the video was supposedly meant to be live footage of the band with fans (similar to their music video for "Faint").

Directed by Dark and shot in Los Angeles, sixty-three feet underground in an abandoned LA Subway tunnel near an abandoned V.A. hospital, the video begins with a group of teenage friends hanging out around a dark alley. Two of them (the male is played by local LA artist Tony "TonyMech" Acosta) follow a strange man wearing a black hooded robe into a door which leads them to a dark, misty room where the band is playing. Monk-like men are performing martial arts moves throughout the video. Midway through the song, they knock over a crate, startling the monk-like men, and then flee the tunnel. Eventually, the strange man appears at the end of the video. While Bennington screams the song's bridge, he is also upside-down as if gravity is inverted for him.

Stand-in bassist Scott Koziol can be seen playing with the band. Mike Shinoda sings some of the lines, although he does not sing on the record.

"One Step Closer" is the only Linkin Park music video to be filmed with SD cameras, which can be seen in 480p and is available in the US exclusively on the Warner Bros. Records YouTube channel.

As of November 2022, the music video for "One Step Closer" has over 150 million views on YouTube.

Track listing

Charts

Weekly charts

Year-end charts

Certifications

Release history

Personnel
Credits adapted from AllMusic for original release only.

Linkin Park
 Chester Bennington – vocals
 Mike Shinoda – keyboards, programming, samples, artwork and production
 Brad Delson – guitars
 Joe Hahn – turntables, samples, synthesizers, artwork
 Rob Bourdon – drums, percussion

Additional musicians
 Scott Koziol – bass

Production
 Don Gilmore – producer, engineering
 Steve Sisco – Engineering
 John Ewing Jr. – Additional engineering, Pro Tools
 Matt Griffin – Engineering assistance
 Andy Wallace – mixing
 Brian Gardner – Audio mastering, digital editing
 Jeff Blue – executive producer

Artwork
Frank Maddocks – graphic design
James Minchin III – photography

References 

2000 songs
2000 debut singles
Linkin Park songs
Music videos directed by Gregory Dark
Songs written by Chester Bennington
Warner Records singles